Scotch Bonnet Ridge is a geologic ridge that crosses the Canada-United States border, in Lake Ontario, south of Prince Edward County.  Scotch Bonnet Island and Nicholson Island lie off the shore of Prince Edward County.

The ridge is composed of glacio-lacustrine clay and till.

References

Ridges of North America
Lake Ontario